The discography of Icehouse, an Australian rock and synthpop band, includes releases under the earlier band name, Flowers, which was formed in 1977 by the mainstay Iva Davies, and was renamed Icehouse in 1981; material was also released by "Iva Davies and Icehouse". Flowers or Icehouse have released seven studio albums, one soundtrack album, as well as four remix albums and forty singles.

As Flowers, in 1980 they released three singles and the album Icehouse in Australia on the independent Regular Records label. After signing with UK-based Chrysalis Records, Flowers changed their name to Icehouse to avoid confusion with similarly named bands. From 1981, Chrysalis released Flowers' material under the Icehouse name including the single "Icehouse" (not released separately in Australia) with a video clip directed by Russell Mulcahy in June 1981. The first new material under the name Icehouse was the Australian 1981 single-only release "Love in Motion", recorded in London while on tour, upon return to Australia Icehouse separated. Davies recorded the 1982 album Primitive Man (released in UK as Love in Motion, 1983) virtually as a solo artist, co-producing with Keith Forsey, but it was released under the name Icehouse. Davies then formed a new line-up to tour UK and North America promoting the album. In 1983, Icehouse released Fresco as an EP, which was the first material from the new line-up. Davies used a similar approach with subsequent releases often having only one or two band members in for recording and then taking an extended line-up out on tour to promote the latest material.

Albums

Studio albums

 a Icehouse was released when the band were called Flowers; in some markets this album is called Flowers by Icehouse.
 b Primitive Man was released in the UK in 1983 as Love in Motion

Soundtrack albums

Remix albums

Live albums

Compilation albums

Extended plays

Singles

Music videos

Video albums

References

External links
 
 
 Icehouse at MusicBrainz
 Official Icehouse - Iva Davies website reactivated on 2008-06-26, archived at Pandora on 2004-07-05

Discographies of Australian artists
Rock music group discographies
Pop music group discographies
New wave discographies
Discography